Bukovlje is a municipality in Brod-Posavina County, Croatia. There are 5,756 inhabitants, of which 96% declare themselves Croats. (2001 census)

The people live in four settlements:

 Bukovlje  
 Vranovci  
 Korduševci  
 Ježevik

References
 

Municipalities of Croatia
Populated places in Brod-Posavina County